Prince Balde (born 23 March 1998) is a Liberian professional footballer who plays as a center-back for Kosovan club Drita and the Liberia national team.

Club career

Drita
On 1 July 2021, Balde signed a two-year contract with Kosovan club Drita and received squad number 26. On 21 August, he made his debut in a 2–1 home win against his former club Feronikeli.

International career
In July 2017, Balde made his debut for Liberia in a friendly match against Mauritania.

References

External links

1998 births
Living people
Sportspeople from Monrovia
Association football central defenders
Liberian footballers
Liberia international footballers
Liberian expatriate footballers
Liberian expatriate sportspeople in Laos
Liberian expatriate sportspeople in Kosovo
Lao Premier League players
Liberian First Division players
Monrovia Club Breweries players
Football Superleague of Kosovo players
KF Feronikeli players
KF Drenica players
FC Drita players